In geology and physical geography, a plateau, also called a high plain or a tableland, is an area of a highland consisting of flat terrain that is raised sharply above the surrounding area on at least one side. Often one or more sides have deep hills or escarpments. Plateaus can be formed by a number of processes, including upwelling of volcanic magma, extrusion of lava, and erosion by water and glaciers. Plateaus are classified according to their surrounding environment as intermontane, piedmont, or continental. A few plateaus may have a small flat top while others have wider ones.

Formation 
Plateaus can be formed by a number of processes, including upwelling of volcanic magma, extrusion of lava, plate tectonics movements, and erosion by water and glaciers.

Volcanic 

Volcanic plateaus are produced by volcanic activity. The Columbia Plateau in the north-western United States is an example. They may be formed by upwelling of volcanic magma or extrusion of lava.

The underlining mechanism in forming plateaus from upwelling starts when magma rises from the mantle, causing the ground to swell upward. In this way, large, flat areas of rock are uplifted to form a plateau. For plateaus formed by extrusion, the rock is built up from lava spreading outward from cracks and weak areas in the crust.

Tectonic 
Tectonic plateaus are formed by tectonic plate movements which cause uplift, and are normally of a considerable size, and a fairly uniform altitude. Examples are the Deccan Plateau in India and the Meseta Central on the Iberian Peninsula.

Erosion 
Plateaus can also be formed by the erosional processes of glaciers on mountain ranges, leaving them sitting between the mountain ranges. Water can also erode mountains and other landforms down into plateaus. Dissected plateaus are highly eroded plateaus cut by rivers and broken by deep narrow valleys. An example is the Scottish Highlands.

Classification 
Plateaus are classified according to their surrounding environment.

 Intermontane plateaus are some of the highest and most extensive plateaus in the world, enclosed by fold mountains. Examples are the Tibetan Plateau between the Himalayas and Kunlun Mountains, Altiplano plateau between two ranges of Andes.
 Lava or volcanic plateaus are the plateau that occur in areas of widespread volcanic eruptions. The magma that comes out through narrow cracks or fissures in the crust spread over large area and solidifies. These layers of lava sheets form lava or volcanic plateaus. The Antrim Plateau in Northern Ireland, the Deccan Plateau in India, and the Columbia Plateau in the United States are examples of lava plateaus.
 Piedmont plateaus are bordered on one side by mountains and on the other by a plain or a sea. The Piedmont Plateau of the Eastern United States between the Appalachian Mountains and the Atlantic Plain is an example.
 Continental plateaus are bordered on all sides by plains or oceans, forming away from the mountains. An example of a continental plateau is the Antarctic Plateau in East Antarctica.

Large plateaus by continent

Africa 
The highest African plateau is the Ethiopian Highlands which cover the central part of Ethiopia. It forms the largest continuous area of its altitude in the continent, with little of its surface falling below 1,500 metres (4,921 ft), while the summits reach heights of up to 4,550 metres (14,928 ft). It is sometimes called the Roof of Africa due to its height and large area.

Another example is the Highveld which is the portion of the South African inland plateau which has an altitude above approximately 1,500 metres, but below 2,100 metres, thus excluding the Lesotho mountain regions. It is home to some of largest South African urban agglomerations.

In Egypt are the Giza Plateau and Galala Mountain, which was once called Gallayat Plateaus, raising 3,300 above sea level.

Antarctica 
The polar ice cap is so massive that the echolocation measurements of ice thickness have shown that large areas are below sea level. But, as the ice melts, the land beneath will rebound through isostasy and ultimately rise above sea level.

Asia 
The largest and highest plateau in the world is the Tibetan Plateau, sometimes metaphorically described as the "Roof of the World", which is still being formed by the collisions of the Indo-Australian and Eurasian tectonic plates. The plateau is sufficiently high to reverse the Hadley cell convection cycles and to drive the monsoons of India towards the south. The Deosai Plains in Pakistan are situated at an average elevation of 4,114 meters (13,497 ft) above sea level. They are considered to be the second highest plateaus in the world.

Other major plateaus in Asia are: Najd on the Arabian Peninsula, elevation 762 to 1,525 m (2,500 to 5,003 ft), Armenian Highlands (≈, elevation ), Iranian Plateau (≈, elevation ), Anatolian Plateau, Mongolian Plateau (≈, elevation ), and the Deccan Plateau (≈, elevation ).

North America 

In northern Arizona and southern Utah the Colorado Plateau is bisected by the Colorado River and the Grand Canyon. This came to be over 10 million years ago, a river was already there, though not necessarily on exactly the same course. Then, subterranean geological forces caused the land in that part of North America to gradually rise by about a centimeter per year for millions of years. An unusual balance occurred: the river that would become the Colorado River was able to erode into the crust of the Earth at a nearly equal rate to the uplift of the plateau.

Another high-altitude plateau in North America is the Mexican Plateau.

Oceania 
The Western Plateau, part of the Australian Shield, is an ancient craton covering much of the continent's southwest, an area of some 700,000 square kilometres. It has an average elevation between 305 and 460 metres.

The North Island Volcanic Plateau is an area of high land occupying much of the centre of the North Island of New Zealand, with volcanoes, lava plateaus, and crater lakes, the most notable of which is the country's largest lake, Lake Taupo. The plateau stretches approximately 100 km east to west and 130 km north to south. The majority of the plateau is more than 600 metres above sea level.

South America 

A tepui, or tepuy, is a table-top mountain or mesa found in the Guiana Highlands of South America, especially in Venezuela and western Guyana. The word tepui means "house of the gods" in the native tongue of the Pemon, the Indigenous people who inhabit the Gran Sabana.

Tepuis can be considered minute plateaus and tend to be found as isolated entities rather than in connected ranges, which makes them the host of a unique array of endemic plant and animal species. Some of the most outstanding tepuis are Neblina, Autana, Auyan and Mount Roraima. They are typically composed of sheer blocks of Precambrian quartz arenite sandstone that rise abruptly from the jungle, giving rise to spectacular natural scenery. Auyán-tepui is the source of Angel Falls, the world's tallest waterfall.

The Colombian capital city of Bogota sits on an Andean plateau known as the Altiplano Cundiboyacense roughly the size of Switzerland.

The parallel Sierra of Andes delimit one of the world highest plateaux: the Altiplano, (Spanish for "high plain"), Andean Plateau or Bolivian Plateau. It lies in west-central South America, where the Andes are at their widest, is the most extensive area of high plateau on Earth outside of Tibet. The bulk of the Altiplano lies within Bolivian and Peruvian territory while its southern parts lie in Chile. The Altiplano plateau hosts several cities like Puno, Oruro, El Alto and La Paz the administrative seat of Bolivia. Northeastern Altiplano is more humid than the Southwestern, the latter of which hosts several salares, or salt flats, due to its aridity. At the Bolivia-Peru border lies Lake Titicaca, the largest lake in South America.

See also

References

Bibliography

External links 

 "Plateau" at scienceclarified.com
 nationalgeographic.com
 travel-university.org
 britannica.com

 
Slope landforms